Posadas is a municipality in Córdoba Province, Spain.

References

External links
 Municipal government website 

Municipalities in the Province of Córdoba (Spain)